Dalanzadgad is the capital of Ömnögovi Aimag in Mongolia. The altitude of the city center is 1,470 meters (4,823 feet).

As of 2011, its population is 19,396.

Transportation
The Dalanzadgad Airport (ZMDZ/DLZ) is served by regular domestic flights from and to Ulaanbaatar. There are summer and winter timetables.

In 2007 the Mongolian Civil Aviation Authority built a new airport with a paved runway. The runway is second longest in the country after Buyant-Ukhaa International Airport. Before that, the airport had only one gravel runway.

The Dalanzadgad town has a paved road connecting it with capital Ulaanbaatar city.

Gallery

Climate
Dalanzadgad experiences a cold desert climate (Köppen BWk) with cold winters and warm summers. By Mongolian standards it is one of the warmest places in the country during winter. Along with Tsetserleg and Arvaikheer it was warmer than Hohhot in January 2014 and 2015. A unique steppe micro-climate with running streams and lush grass can be found in the nearby Yolyn Am valley.

Communications and Power

There is GSM coverage in the city the same as in other major locations - the coverage is good for about a mile out of the city. Usually, the city is also supplied with electric power 24 hours a day.
Near Dalanzadgad, at 43°31′54.38″N 104°24′4.16″E, there is a longwave broadcasting station working on 209 kHz with 75 kW.

External links
 An extended Market Research on Dalanzadgad

References

Districts of Ömnögovi Province
Aimag centers